Beanstalk International Bilingual School (BIBS) is a K-12 and Kindergarten international school system in Beijing, China. It is managed by the Beanstalk Education Group (青苗教育集团), and was first established as a kindergarten in 1993.
 BIBS Shunyi Campus (K-12) in Tianzhu Town, Shunyi District
 BIBS Upper East Side (UES) Elementary School (K-6) in Chaoyang District
 BIBS Dongrun Campus (K-6) in Chaoyang District

References

External links
 Beanstalk International Bilingual School
  Beanstalk International Bilingual School

High schools in Beijing
Schools in Shunyi District
Schools in Chaoyang District, Beijing

International schools in Beijing
International Baccalaureate schools in China